A sunburst is a  design or figure  commonly used in architectural ornaments and design patterns and possibly pattern books.  It consists of rays or "beams" radiating out from a central disk in the  manner of sunbeams. Sometimes part of a sunburst, a semicircular or semi-elliptical shape, is used.  Traditional sunburst motifs usually show the rays narrowing as they get further from the centre; from the later 19th century they often get wider, as in the Japanese Rising Sun Flag, which is more appropriate in optical terms.

In architecture, the sunburst is often used in window designs, including fanlights and rose windows, as well as in decorative motifs.  The sunburst motif is characteristic of Baroque church metalwork, especially monstrances and votive crowns, and Art Deco and Art Nouveau styles as well as church architecture.  A sunburst is frequently used in emblems and military decorations.

Sunbursts can appear in photographs  when taking a picture of the Sun through the diaphragm of a lens set to a narrow aperture due to diffraction; the effect is often called a sunstar.

In information visualization, a sunburst diagram or sunburst chart is a multilevel pie chart used to represent the proportion of different values found at each level in a hierarchy.

Badges
The sunburst was the badge of king Edward III of England, and has thus become the badge of office of Windsor Herald.

Gallery

See also

Footnotes

Ornaments (architecture)
Visual motifs
Solar symbols